50 West 66th Street is a skyscraper currently under construction for the Upper West Side of Manhattan in New York City. It is being developed by Extell Development Company and designed by Snøhetta. Construction began in 2018.

The building will contain setbacks, private loggias, chamfered corners, and a 16th-floor communal terrace. The facade will be made of limestone and burnished bronze beneath the 16th floor and glass with burnished-bronze chamfers above that floor. The building was originally to be 25 stories, but the plans were later changed. When plans for an enlarged , 69-story tower were released in late 2017, the tower faced immediate opposition by those living in the neighborhood. The city approved the tower, overriding neighborhood opposition, in December 2018. After neighborhood groups filed a lawsuit to block the project, claiming that increased height was due to misuse of mechanical space, the New York City Board of Standards and Appeals voted to approve the building permit in January 2020.

References

Residential skyscrapers in Manhattan
Upper West Side
Proposed buildings and structures in New York City
Buildings and structures under construction in the United States
Condominiums and housing cooperatives in Manhattan
Residential condominiums in New York City